"She's Always a Woman" is a song by Billy Joel from his 1977 album, The Stranger. It is a love song about a modern woman whom the singer has fallen totally in love with to the extent of falling for her endearing quirks as well as her flaws. The single peaked at No. 17 in the U.S. in Oct. 1978, and at No. 53 in the UK in 1986, when it was released as a double A-side with "Just the Way You Are". It re-entered the UK chart in 2010, reaching No. 29. The song is played in the compound time signature of 6/8.

Origin and meaning
The song was released as a single in 1978, following several other hits from The Stranger including "Just the Way You Are", "Movin' Out (Anthony's Song)" and "Only the Good Die Young". The song entered the Billboard Hot 100 chart on August 12, 1978, and peaked at #17 on October 14 of that year.  Musically, Joel has said that he was influenced by Gordon Lightfoot and his mellow acoustic guitar ballads. It is a love song that Joel wrote for his then-wife, Elizabeth Weber. Elizabeth had taken over management of Joel's career, and was able to put his financial affairs in order after Joel had signed some bad deals and contracts.  The two eventually divorced in 1982.

Composition
Joel stated in an interview that he was attempting to replicate the fingerpicking common in folk guitar music. He accomplishes this by playing arpeggiated triads in the right hand. He also notes that the production was purposely minimal to capture the purity of the tune as a folk song.

Joel claims that the meter of the song is 6/8. This splits each measure into two full triad ascending arpeggios. The song is in the key of Eb major. It begins with singing over the chords each played without the arpeggio in the first verse, each chord lasting a full measure. In the second verse he begins arpeggiating, with each chord again lasting a full measure.

The choruses are in the relative minor of Eb major, which is C minor. In the second part of each chorus Joel switches to the parallel minor of Eb minor before returning to verse.

Reception
Billboard described "She's Always a Woman" as a "dramatic ballad." Billboard particularly praised the "subtle orchestration" and "sophisticated melody," which it found comparable to ballads by Bob Dylan and Paul Simon.  Cash Box said that "the tune is melodic and flows sweetly; the lyric is precise and has something to say" and praised Joel's singing. Record World said that "it is much like a [natural] progression of the message in 'Just the Way You Are' and should pick up immediate pop and adult airplay."

An instrumental version of the song was heard playing on the plaza of the World Trade Center on September 11, 2001, about 30 minutes before the collapse of the South Tower, followed by the instrumental version of How Deep is Your Love, by The Bee Gees. Captured by a cameraman filming nearby, the playing of the song was viewed as "surreal" against the backdrop of carnage and destruction.

Track listing

7" single (1977)
 "She's Always a Woman"
 "Vienna"

Single (CBS)
 "She's Always a Woman"
 "Movin' Out (Anthony's Song)"

Japanese 7" single (CBS 06SP 248)
 "She's Always a Woman"
 "Only the Good Die Young"

Charts

Certifications

Fyfe Dangerfield cover

Fyfe Dangerfield, lead singer of the band Guillemots, recorded a version of this song in 2010 which was used in an advertisement for the British department store John Lewis. Subsequently, the Billy Joel original re-entered the UK Singles Chart at No. 29 on May 1, 2010. On May 1, 2010, a new version of the advert aired; which shows more of the song cover. In the annual ITV poll for 2010 advert of the year; "John Lewis – She's always a Woman" ranked fourth.

The advert has been viewed on YouTube over 570,000 times (collectively from the top 3 results) since it aired on TV.

Chart performance
"She's Always a Woman" debuted on the UK Singles Chart on May 2, 2010, at No. 99. On its second week in the chart, the single climbed 85 places to No. 14, marking Dangerfield's most successful single to date. On May 16, 2010, the single climbed seven places to its peak of No. 7 before falling to No. 9 in its second week within the top 10.

Track listing
Digital download
 "She's Always a Woman" – 3:14

Charts

Weekly charts

Year-end charts

References

1970s ballads
1977 singles
1978 singles
Billy Joel songs
Songs written by Billy Joel
Song recordings produced by Phil Ramone
Columbia Records singles
Polydor Records singles
1977 songs
Rock ballads
Pop ballads